Say Their Names is a mural in Louisville, Kentucky.

Description and history
Unveiled in July 2020, the artwork depicts the faces of Sandra Bland, George Floyd, David McAtee, Elijah McClain, and Breonna Taylor. It was vandalized in June 2021. Artist Whitney Holbourn repaired the mural and added the face of Travis Nagdy.

The phrase "Say Their Names" was coined to bring attention to victims of systemic racism and racial injustice in the United States. The movement stems from the 2014 movement SayHerName in response to the death of Bland, and has since gained significant traction when discussing racial injustice in the United States.

See also

 2020 in art

References

2020 establishments in Kentucky
2020 paintings
2020s murals
Black Lives Matter art
Black people in art
Monuments and memorials in Kentucky
Murals in Kentucky
Paintings of people
Public art in Louisville, Kentucky
Social justice
Vandalized works of art in Kentucky